WZJR (91.7 FM) is a radio station in Portland, Indiana. It was originally established in 1996 as WBSJ by Ball State University It primarily featured National Public Radio programming. The transmitter for WBSJ failed in January 2019.  Ball State University, the license owner, chose not to replace it due to cost. In April 2020, Ball State University announced its intention to sell WBSJ to Jayland Radio, Inc. for $40,702.43; the sale was consummated on August 31, 2020.

References

External links
Indiana Public Radio official website

ZJR
Radio stations established in 1998
1998 establishments in Indiana